Wolfsberg Castle may refer to the following castles:

 Wolfsberg Castle (Carinthia), in Wolfsberg, Carinthia, Austria
 Wolfsberg Castle (Harz), a ruined castle in the Harz mountains, Saxony-Anhalt, Germany
 Wolfsberg Castle (Obertrubach), a ruined castle in Obertrubach, in Franconian Switzerland, Bavaria, Germany

See also
 Wolfsburg Castle, Neustadt
Wolfsburg Castle, Wolfsburg